A plebiscite on the boundary between Northwest Territories and the new territory of Nunavut was held in the Northwest Territories on 4 May 1992. The proposed border was approved by 54% of voters. A second referendum later in the year gave the final approval to the creation of the new territory.

Background
A 1982 referendum had approved the division of the Northwest Territories and the creation of a new territory, later to become Nunavut. The federal government gave a conditional agreement to the plan seven months later. In December 1991 the federal government reached an agreement with the Inuit on their land claims, with the "Parker line" (named for former Commissioner John Havelock Parker who worked on establishing the borders) set as the boundary between the existing territory and the new one. The boundary roughly approximates the tree line in Canada.

Results

References

Referendums in the Northwest Territories
Politics of Nunavut
History of Nunavut
1992 in Canadian politics
1992 referendums
1992 in Nunavut
1992 in the Northwest Territories